Khairunnisa binti Awang Hj Ash'ari (born 1987) is a Bruneian activist and politician, known for her work on environmentalism and women's rights. She has been an appointed member of the Legislative Council of Brunei since 2017. In 2015, she became the first Bruneian recipient of the Queen's Young Leaders Award.

Early life and education 
Ash'ari was born in 1987 in Brunei. She graduated from the Universiti Brunei Darussalam in 2011. She later studied at King's College London through a Chevening Scholarship, graduating with a master's degree in environment, politics, and globalization in 2016.

Career 
Ash'ari first became involved in activism around 2011. In 2012, she co-founded Green Brunei, a youth-centered environmentalist group. She later served as director of another environmental initiative, Green Xchange. Additionally, Ash'ari was a member of the Brunei Youth Council and co-led the ASEAN Young Professionals Volunteer Corps.

Ash'ari won the Bruneian sultan's Youth Service Award in 2013 and the ASEAN Youth Day Award in 2014. Then, in 2015, she became the first Bruneian to receive the Queen's Young Leaders Award.

In 2017, she was appointed as a member of the Legislative Council of Brunei, holding a functional seat reserved for individuals who have achieved distinction in their professional lives. At the time, she was the council's youngest member. On the council, Ash'ari has served as an advocate for women's rights in Brunei. She has fought for better protections against sexual harassment and argued that women should be eligible to become village heads.

Honours 

  Order of Setia Negara Brunei Fourth Class (PSB)

External links 

 Khairunnisa on Instagram

References 

1987 births
Living people
Bruneian women in politics
Environmentalists
Members of the Legislative Council of Brunei
Recipients of the Queen’s Young Leader Award
Universiti Brunei Darussalam alumni